Tom Cecic was a Croatian American soccer defender who spent two seasons in the North American Soccer League and earned one cap with the U.S. national team.

NASL
Cecic spent two seasons in the North American Soccer League. In 1968, he played for the Chicago Mustangs and in 1973 with the Miami Toros.

National team
Cecic earned his one cap with the national team in a 3–3 tie with Israel on September 15, 1968 when he came on for Adolph Bachmeier.

Grandchildren
Tiho Cecic has 7 grandchildren whom he loved greatly. Three of them were boys, Augustino Piso, Orlando Cecic, and AJ Bilardello. Four of them were girls, Marcella & Isabella Piso, Gabriella Cecic, and Jordana Bilardello.

References

External links
 NASL stats
 Hollander, Zander. The American encyclopedia of soccer, 1st Edition, Everest House Publishers, 1980, p 367,  (CECIC, TOM Defender B. Aug. 18, 1941 Yugoslavia)

1941 births
Yugoslav footballers
American soccer players
Chicago Mustangs (1967–68) players
Yugoslav emigrants to the United States
Miami Toros players
North American Soccer League (1968–1984) players
United States men's international soccer players
Living people
Association football defenders